The Sushui Jiwen (涑水記聞; "Records of Rumours from Sushui") is a book written by the Song Dynasty historian Sima Guang (1019–1086) in imperial China. While he might have intended to include them in Tongjian Changbian, the "weird" stories became Sushui Jiwen in  1180 after his death. The Sushui (涑水; "Su Water") is a small tributary of the Yellow River, and Sima Guang was nicknamed Mr. Sushui (涑水先生) as his hometown of Xia County is on the Sushui. Because the book was compiled by later editors, the number of chapters vary according to the edition: one has 10 chapters, another has 2, and the one in Siku Quanshu has 16 — although many repetitions occur in ch. 9–13.

References
 

12th-century history books
Chinese history texts
Song dynasty literature
1180s books
12th-century Chinese books